The  ("Later Collection Continued") was an imperial anthology of Japanese waka poetry. It was finished in 1251 CE, three years after the Retired Emperor Go-Saga first ordered it in 1248. It was compiled by Fujiwara no Tameie, son of Fujiwara no Teika. It consists of twenty volumes containing 1,368 poems. It is characterized by the conservative taste and general competency (but not excellence) of the Nijō faction that would be founded by Tameie's son.

See also
 1251 in poetry
 1251 in literature
 List of Japanese anthologies

References
pg. 484 of Japanese Court Poetry, Earl Miner, Robert H. Brower. 1961, Stanford University Press, LCCN 61-10925

13th-century books
Japanese poetry anthologies
Early Middle Japanese texts
1250s in Japan